Gangacharan Dixit is an Indian politician. He was elected to the Lok Sabha, lower house of the Parliament of India from Khandwa, Madhya Pradesh as a member of the Indian National Congress.

References

External links
 Official biographical sketch in Parliament of India website

Lok Sabha members from Madhya Pradesh
India MPs 1971–1977
India MPs 1977–1979
Indian National Congress politicians
1901 births
Year of death missing